David Narváez Barrera (born 11 July 1985) is a Spanish footballer who plays for Lucena CF as a winger or forward.

Football career
Born in Jerez de la Frontera, Andalusia, Narváez was a product of the youth system at his hometown club, Xerez CD. He made his senior debuts with the reserves in the 2004–05 season, competing for several years with the side in the lower leagues. On 22 May 2005 he made his professional debut, starting in a 0–0 home draw against Recreativo de Huelva in the Segunda División. He scored his first professional goal in the next match, in a 1–1 away draw against Real Murcia.

In August 2006, Narváez and his brother were loaned to AD Ceuta of the Segunda División B. The following July he joined UD Los Palacios of the Tercera División, also on loan.

Narváez left Xerez in the 2008 summer, and played the five following seasons in the fourth tier, representing Jerez Industrial CF, Puerto Real CF, Lorca Deportiva CF, CD Ronda, San Fernando CD, CF Amposta and Algeciras CF.

On 19 July 2013 Narváez returned to the Segunda B, joining UB Conquense. After being ever-present in midfield during the campaign, he moved to fellow third-tier team Lucena CF on 4 July 2014.

Personal life
Narváez's twin brother and cousin, Sergio and Kiko, respectively, are both footballers; the former played alongside him in Xerez, and the latter spent most of his career with Atlético Madrid.

References

External links
 
 Futbolme profile  
 

1985 births
Living people
Footballers from Jerez de la Frontera
Spanish footballers
Association football wingers
Association football forwards
Segunda División players
Segunda División B players
Tercera División players
Xerez CD B players
Xerez CD footballers
AD Ceuta footballers
Jerez Industrial CF players
Lorca Deportiva CF footballers
Algeciras CF footballers
UB Conquense footballers
Lucena CF players